Confusion Lake is a small alpine lake in Elmore County, Idaho, United States, located in the Sawtooth Mountains in the Sawtooth National Recreation Area.  The lake is accessed from Sawtooth National Forest trail 479 along Timpa Creek or 462 along the Middle Fork of the Boise River.

Confusion Lake is in the Sawtooth Wilderness, and a wilderness permit can be obtained at a registration box at trailheads or wilderness boundaries.  Upstream of Confusion Lake is Low Pass Lake while Surprise Lake and Timpa Lake are downstream.

See also
 List of lakes of the Sawtooth Mountains (Idaho)
 Sawtooth National Forest
 Sawtooth National Recreation Area
 Sawtooth Range (Idaho)

References

Lakes of Idaho
Lakes of Elmore County, Idaho
Glacial lakes of the United States
Glacial lakes of the Sawtooth Wilderness